Events in the year 1997 in the Netherlands.

Incumbents
 Monarch: Beatrix
 Prime Minister: Wim Kok

Events
6 to 14 September – The 1997 Men's European Volleyball Championship was held in the Netherlands, in the two cities of Den Bosch and Eindhoven.

Births
  
   
   
   

2 January – Gijs Blom, actor 
4 January – Patrick Maneschijn, footballer
5 January – Thijs van Dam, field hockey player
7 January – Pablo Rosario, footballer
19 January – Marcel Bosker, speed skater
31 January – Arnaut Danjuma, footballer
31 January – Thijs Dekker, footballer 
7 February – Jan Verduijn, footballer
8 February – Robin Ciric, kickboxer 
8 February – Pascal Eenkhoorn, cyclist.
10 February – Maan de Steenwinkel, singer and actress
16 February – Thijmen Goppel, footballer
17 February – Lugman Bezzat, footballer
28 February – Joanne Koenders, water polo player
17 March – Daniel Sprong, ice hockey player
28 March – Asad Zulfiqar, cricketer
4 May – Wietse van Lankveld, footballer
12 May – Frenkie de Jong, footballer
2 June – Michel Vlap, footballer 
3 June – Solomonica de Winter, writer
26 June – Joost Meendering, footballer
3 July – Jeremy Helmer, footballer
8 July – Kevin Inkelaar, cyclist.
22 July – Terrence Bieshaar, basketball player 
23 July – Jelle de Louw, footballer
23 July – Fabian Plak, volleyball player 
2 August – Esmee de Graaf, footballer
6 August – Rinka Duijndam, handball player.
9 August – Yara Kastelijn, racing cyclist.
5 September – Maartje Verhoef, fashion model 
25 September – Suzanne Schulting, speed skater.
1 October – Stan van Bladeren, footballer
8 October – Steven Bergwijn, footballer
10 October – Tessa Polder, volleyball player
26 December – Nicole Oude Luttikhuis, volleyball player

Deaths 
 

5 January – Frans Piët, comics artist (b. 1905)
10 January – Julie van der Veen, visual artist (b. 1903)
21 January – Jan Dekkers, painter, designer and sculptor (b. 1919)
8 March – Niel Steenbergen, sculptor, painter and medalist (b. 1911) 
26 May – Jack Jersey, singer, composer, arranger, lyricist and music producer (b. 1941)
10 June – Leo Fuld, singer (b. 1912)
8 July – Dick van Dijk, footballer (b. 1946)
6 August – Berend Hendriks, artist (b. 1918)
15 August – Ida Gerhardt, classicist and poet (b. 1905)
15 November – Coen van Vrijberghe de Coningh, actor, musician, composer, record producer and television presenter (b. 1950)
20 December – Jan van Stolk, ceramist (b. 1920)

References

 
1990s in the Netherlands
Years of the 20th century in the Netherlands
Netherlands
Netherlands